Antaeotricha frontalis is a moth in the family Depressariidae. It was described by Philipp Christoph Zeller in 1855. It is found in Mexico and Guatemala.

References

Moths described in 1855
frontalis
Moths of Central America